Sverre Holm Gundersen (24 July 1931 – 17 March 2005) was a Norwegian stage and film actor. He is probably best known for playing "Benny" in the Olsenbanden-movies (1969–1999), and as station master O. Tidemann the Norwegian children's program Sesam Stasjon (1990–1998), the Norwegian version of the US program, Sesame Street.
Sverre Holm was born in Drammen and was in his youth a relatively good player for a bandy club known as Drafn. He married three times: to Marit Gulbrandsen (later divorced), to the actress Sissel Juul (1939–1987) in 1963, and to the occupational nurse Kari Anne Harnes in 1990. He died in Larvik, Norway at the age of 73, from cancer.

References

External links

1931 births
2005 deaths
Deaths from cancer in Norway
Norwegian male film actors
Norwegian male stage actors
People from Drammen